Juma Mussa Mkambala (born 1 September 1989), popularly known by his artist name Jux and sometimes referred to as 'African Boy', is a Tanzanian Artist and Songwriter. Born in Dar es Salaam, his interest in music began at a young age, when at the age of 16 he began to rap. However it is his singing that he is best known for to date, and is considered one of Tanzania's highest paid artists. In 2008 when Jux signed to Tanzanian record label A.M records, he began to record R&B songs instead. Since then he has released several hit songs, including 'Sugua' featuring Diamond Platnumz, 'Juu' featuring Vanessa Mdee, and most recently 'Regina' featuring Otile Brown. In 2018 his song 'Uzuri Wako' (translation: Your Goodness) was banned by the Tanzanian Communications Regulatory Authority, along with songs from several other artists, including Diamond Platnumz, for going against Tanzanian morals and values. Jux he is regarded one of the best and successful artists in Tanzania of all time.

In 2015, he received an award for 'Best R&B song' at Kili Music Awards, also known as the national Tanzania Music Awards. In 2017 he received an award for the Best East African Music Video at the Zanzibar International Film Festival (2017). And in 2018 and 2019, he was nominated for 'Best Male East Africa' at the AFRIMMA awards. He also appeared performed on Coke Studio Africa in 2019. After numerous single releases, his first album titled 'The Love Album' was released in 2019, featuring tracks from several artists including Nigerian artist Singah and Diamond Platnumz. Jux he is regarded one of the best and successful artist in Tanzania  of all time.

Personal life 
Jux's 6 - year relationship with fellow Tanzanian Artist Vanessa Mdee was widely publicised; during this time with they toured together across the region, and released several singles. In 2018 they embarked on the 'In Love with Money' tour, which remains to date one of the Tanzanian's biggest independent tours. The relationship however, came to an end in 2019 shortly after allegations of infidelity began to circulate following the posting of pictures of Vanessa Mdee hugging the American R&B artist Trey Songz. Jux has since been linked to several socialites and his dating life remains a source of interest across East Africa

Jux also has a deep interest in fashion, and established his own brand in 2018, for which he curates and designs. The brand widely available across East Africa, in part due to production deal he signed with Chinese deal in 2019. He recently announced that he would be expanding his brand into Kenya over the course of the coming year

Awards and nominations

Discography

Albums

Jux released his debut studio album 'The Love Album' in 2019, consisting of a total of 18 songs. To date the album has received more than 1.3 million streams on Boomplay, making it one of the most streamed East African R&B albums to date. The album's lead single 'Sugua' was a hit, amassing more than 10 million views on YouTube. The album was distributed by Africori the largest digital music distribution company in Sub-Saharan Africa, a partner of Warner Music Group

Singles and collaborations

References

1989 births
Tanzanian Muslims
Living people
21st-century Tanzanian male singers
People from Dar es Salaam
Tanzanian Bongo Flava musicians
Swahili-language singers